The Mantos Blancos mine is a large copper mine located in northern Chile in Antofagasta Region. Mantos Blancos represents one of the largest copper reserves in Chile and in the world having estimated reserves of 500 million tonnes of ore grading 1% copper.

See also 
List of mines in Chile
Mining in Chile

References 

Copper mines in Chile
Mines in Antofagasta Region
Surface mines in Chile